Tha Chang railway station (spelt 'Tha Shang' on signage) is a railway station located in Khao Than Subdistrict, Tha Chang District, Surat Thani.

Train services 
 Rapid No. 167/168 Bangkok-Kantang-Bangkok
 Local No. 445/446 Chumphon-Hat Yai Junction-Chumphon

References 
 
 

Railway stations in Thailand